Inge Dekker (born 18 August 1985) is a Dutch former competitive swimmer who specialised in butterfly and freestyle events.  She won the bronze medal with the Dutch women's 4×100-metre freestyle relay team at the 2004 Summer Olympics in Athens, alongside teammates Inge de Bruijn, Marleen Veldhuis and Chantal Groot. At the 2008 Summer Olympics in Beijing, Dekker became Olympic champion in the 4×100-metre freestyle together with Ranomi Kromowidjojo, Femke Heemskerk and Marleen Veldhuis, setting a then Olympic record.  At the 2012 Summer Olympics, she was part of the Dutch 4 x 100 metre freestyle team that won the silver medal, with Veldhuis, Heemskerk and Kromowidjojo, behind the Australian team who set a new Olympic record.

Personal life
Dekker's younger sister Lia was also a member of the Dutch national swimming team.

In February 2016, Dekker was diagnosed with cervical cancer. In March, she had a successful surgery and she made the 2016 Summer Olympics, which were her fourth Olympics.

Personal bests

See also
 List of world records in swimming
 List of European records in swimming
 List of Dutch records in swimming

References
 Profile on Zwemkroniek (in Dutch)

External links
 
 
 
 
 
 

1985 births
Living people
Dutch female butterfly swimmers
Dutch female freestyle swimmers
Olympic bronze medalists for the Netherlands
Olympic gold medalists for the Netherlands
Olympic bronze medalists in swimming
Olympic swimmers of the Netherlands
People from Assen
Swimmers at the 2004 Summer Olympics
Swimmers at the 2008 Summer Olympics
Swimmers at the 2012 Summer Olympics
Swimmers at the 2016 Summer Olympics
World Aquatics Championships medalists in swimming
World record holders in swimming
Olympic silver medalists for the Netherlands
Medalists at the FINA World Swimming Championships (25 m)
European Aquatics Championships medalists in swimming
Medalists at the 2012 Summer Olympics
Medalists at the 2008 Summer Olympics
Medalists at the 2004 Summer Olympics
Olympic gold medalists in swimming
Olympic silver medalists in swimming
21st-century Dutch women
Sportspeople from Drenthe